Cyclopentadienone is an organic compound with molecular formula C5H4O.  The parent cyclopentadienone is rarely encountered, because it rapidly dimerizes. Many substituted derivatives are known, notably tetraphenylcyclopentadienone.  Such compounds are used as ligands in organometallic chemistry.

Preparation

See also 
 Dienone

References

Ketones
Fully conjugated nonaromatic rings